Jan Carinci (born February 2, 1959 in London, England) is a former slotback who played ten seasons in the Canadian Football League, mainly for the Toronto Argonauts. He was a part of the Argonauts 1983 Grey Cup victory.

He resides with his family in Moncton, New Brunswick, and writes a sports column for the Times & Transcript newspaper.

Further reading

References

1959 births
Maryland Terrapins football players
Toronto Argonauts players
BC Lions players
Canadian football slotbacks
Canadian players of Canadian football
Sportspeople from London
Living people